Shiloh Township may refer to one of the following places in the United States:
 Shiloh Township, Randolph County, Arkansas
 Shiloh Township, Edgar County, Illinois
 Shiloh Township, Jefferson County, Illinois
 and also Shiloh Valley Township, St. Clair County, Illinois
 Shiloh Township, Grundy County, Iowa
 Shiloh Township, Neosho County, Kansas
 Shiloh Township, Camden County, North Carolina
 Shiloh Township, Iredell County, North Carolina

See also
 Shiloh (disambiguation)

Township name disambiguation pages